Luca Vanni was the defending champion but lost in the first round to Gerard Granollers.

Jaume Munar won the title after defeating Alex De Minaur 6–3, 6–4 in the final.

Seeds

Draw

Finals

Top half

Bottom half

References
Main Draw
Qualifying Draw

Open Castilla y León - Men's Singles
2017 Men's Singles
2017 Open Castilla y León